The Hard Stuff is the thirteenth studio album by George Thorogood and the Destroyers.  It was released on May 30, 2006, on the Eagle Records label.  The album peaked at No. 27 on the Billboard charts. It was their first album recorded after the departure of long time saxophone player Hank "Hurricane" Carter, a  23-year member of the band.

Track listing
 "The Hard Stuff" (George Thorogood, Jim Suhler, Tom Hambridge) – 3:51
 "Hello Josephine" (Dave Bartholomew, Antoine "Fats" Domino Jr.) – 3:05
 "Moving" (Chester Arthur Burnett) – 4:13
 "I Got My Eyes On You" (Mike Morgan) – 3:32
 "I Didn't Know" (Thorogood, Hambridge) – 2:56
 "Any Town U.S.A." (Thorogood, Suhler, Hambridge) – 4:16
 "Little Rain" (Ewart Abner, Jimmy Reed) – 4:09
 "Cool It!" (Suhler) – 3:01
 "Love Doctor" (Richard Fleming, Hambridge) – 3:39
 "Dynaflow Blues" (Johnny Shines) – 3:45
 "Rock Party" (Holland K. Smith) – 4:22
 "Drifter's Escape" (Bob Dylan) – 3:15
 "Give Me Back My Wig" (Theodore Roosevelt "Hound Dog" Taylor) – 4:25
 "Takin' Care Of Business" (Rudy Toombs) – 4:12
 "Huckle Up Baby" (Bernard Besman, John Lee Hooker) – 3:59

Personnel

Delaware Destroyers
George Thorogood – guitar, vocals
Jim Suhler – guitar
Bill Blough – bass
Jeff Simon – drums
Buddy Leach – saxophone

Additional musicians
Rick Steff – accordion, piano

Technical
Delaware Destroyers – producer
Jim Gaines – producer
Tom Hambridge – producer
Shawn Berman – engineer
Leon Zervos – mastering
Joshua Blanchard, Jason Gillespie, Jay Goin, Adam Hill - assistant engineers 
Henry Marquez – art direction
Chris Cuffaro – photography
Steve Morse – liner notes

References

George Thorogood and the Destroyers albums
2006 albums
Eagle Records albums